Rajkumari Surajkala was an Indian politician from the state of the Madhya Pradesh.
She represented Budhni Vidhan Sabha constituency in Madhya Pradesh Legislative Assembly by winning General election of 1957.

References 

Year of birth missing
Possibly living people
Madhya Pradesh MLAs 1957–1962
People from Sehore district
Indian National Congress politicians from Madhya Pradesh